John Warden (born 25 August 1951) is a former Australian rules footballer who played with Carlton in the Victorian Football League (VFL).

Notes

External links 

John Warden's profile at Blueseum

1951 births
Carlton Football Club players
Australian rules footballers from Victoria (Australia)
Living people